John Goodman (died 1642) was a Welsh Jesuit novice and secular priest active in England. He was born in Denbighshire and graduated from St John's College, Cambridge, being ordained in the Church of England in 1618. He became a Catholic convert and seminary priest in France, around 1621, before returning to England on mission.

Goodman was jailed and sentenced to death under an Elizabethan penal law which made it illegal for Jesuits to be in England.  He was granted a reprieve by Charles I but was questioned by the Long Parliament.  Charles I did not interfere and Parliament was content to let Goodman die in prison in 1642.

References
 Austin Woolrych, Britain in Revolution. (New York : Oxford University Press, 2002).

Notes

1642 deaths
17th-century Welsh Jesuits
Year of birth unknown
Alumni of St John's College, Cambridge
Venerable martyrs of England and Wales
1590 births